The Uninvited is a British television science fiction mystery thriller mini-series, created by Leslie Grantham and written by Peter Bowker, first broadcast on ITV between 25 September and 16 October 1997. The series was co-produced by Zenith Entertainment and Anglia Television.

Production
The series was filmed in and around Norwich, with scenes filmed at the University of East Anglia, Norwich Magistrate's Court and the offices of the Eastern Daily Press in Norwich city centre. The series was novelised by Paul Cornell and published by Virgin Books.. Cornell, a huge fan of the BBC science fiction television series Doctor Who (who at that point had written several licensed novels based on the programme), cheekily included a cameo appearance at the end from Doctor Who character Brigadier Lethbridge-Stewart, although the character is unnamed in the book.

A soundtrack album accompanying the series, with music composed by Martin Kiszko, was released on 6 October 1997 via Ocean Deep Records. The complete series was first released on VHS on 26 January 2000, followed by a DVD release on 28 July 2003. The DVD combines the four fifty-minute episodes into two feature-length episodes of 100 minutes each.

Plot
Steve Blake (Douglas Hodge), a photographer and former journalist, witnesses the head of British Nuclear Power, James Wilson (David Allister) killed in a horrific car crash. However, the next day, Wilson turns up alive and well. Blake discovers a connection to the village of Sweethope, which collapsed into the sea following a chemical explosion. The population of the village was reportedly saved by two police officers, John Ferguson (Ian Brimble) and Philip Gates (Leslie Grantham). Blake is suspicious when he discovers a prominent number of the survivors have all gone on to obtain positions of power within the British establishment.

Cast
 Douglas Hodge as Steve Blake 
 Leslie Grantham as Chief Supt. Philip Gates
 Lia Williams as Melissa Gates 
 Sylvestra Le Touzel as Joanna Ball 
 David Allister as James Wilson 
 Ian Brimble as Supt. John Ferguson 
 Caroline Lee-Johnson as Sarah Armstrong 
 Gillian Barge as Mary Madigan 
 Eamon Boland as Patrick Leonard
 Natasha Rout as Fiona Leonard 
 Matt Patresi as David Hallworth 
 Simon Cook as Mark Knowles
 Christopher Scoular as Jon Davidson 
 Oliver Ford Davies as Gerald Ryle 
 Ben George as David Leonard
 Jean Anderson as Elizabeth Madigan
 Michael Cochrane as Oliver James
 Denzil Kilvington as Gary Cartwright
 Brian Hewlett as John Beck

Episodes

References

External links

1990s British drama television series
1990s British horror television series
1990s British mystery television series
1990s British science fiction television series
1997 British television series debuts
1997 British television series endings
1990s British television miniseries
Alien invasions in television
British thriller television series
English-language television shows
ITV television dramas
Television series by ITV Studios
Television shows produced by Anglia Television
Television shows set in Norfolk